The Journal of Agricultural and Environmental Ethics is a biannual peer-reviewed academic journal covering agricultural science and bioethics. It was established in 1988 as the Journal of Agricultural Ethics, obtaining its current name in 1991. The editor-in-chief is Jeffrey Burkhardt (Institute of Food and Agricultural Sciences). According to the Journal Citation Reports, the journal has a 2015 impact factor of 1.188, ranking it 19th out of 51 journals in the category "Ethics".

See also 
 List of ethics journals

References

External links

Agricultural journals
Biannual journals
Bioethics journals
English-language journals
Environmental ethics journals
Environmental science journals
Publications established in 1988
Springer Science+Business Media academic journals